Margit Tøsdal (14 April 1918 – 12 January 1993) was a Norwegian politician for the Labour Party.

She was born in Os.

She was elected to the Norwegian Parliament from Hordaland in 1961, and was re-elected on two occasions. She had previously served as a deputy representative in the period 1958–1961.

Tøsdal was President of the Lagting 1977–1981.

She was a member of Os municipality council from 1951 to 1955.

References

1918 births
1993 deaths
Labour Party (Norway) politicians
Members of the Storting
Women members of the Storting
People from Os, Hordaland
20th-century Norwegian women politicians
20th-century Norwegian politicians